Hyphodontia curvispora is a species of fungus belonging to the family Schizoporaceae.

It is native to Europe and Southern America.

References

Hymenochaetales